Bernard Blancan (born 9 September 1958) is a French actor. He has appeared in more than 85 films and television shows since 1989. He shared the award for Best Actor for his role in Days of Glory at the 2006 Cannes Film Festival.

Filmography

Actor

Filmmaker

Theater

Author

References

External links

1958 births
Living people
French male film actors
French male television actors
People from Bayonne
French-Basque people
20th-century French male actors
21st-century French male actors
Cannes Film Festival Award for Best Actor winners